Franklin Barbecue is a barbecue restaurant located in Austin, Texas, founded in 2009 by Aaron Franklin. The restaurant has attracted a national following.

History
In 2009, Aaron Franklin launched the restaurant in a trailer. The restaurant has sold out of brisket every day since its establishment. Franklin Barbecue moved to a brick and mortar location in 2011. The building was painted in the same color scheme as the original trailer Franklin started in. The restaurant appeared on Anthony Bourdain: No Reservations in September 2012. In July 2014, President Barack Obama visited the restaurant and bought lunch for those in line behind him. The restaurant is prominently featured in a scene from the 2014 Jon Favreau film Chef, with speaking cameos by owner Aaron Franklin and general manager Benji Jacob.

Fire and reopening 
In the early morning of August 26, 2017, a fire broke out in the smoke house section of the Austin eatery, heavily damaging portions of the outer building. The main restaurant area suffered only smoke damage. The restaurant would close for three months before returning as a smaller operation in November 2017. By March of 2018, the smokehouse had been redesigned and rebuilt.

Food 
Franklin Barbecue has been credited with leading the new-traditionalist barbecue movement. Their menu consists of pulled pork, pork ribs, sausages, turkey and brisket. For his Texas style brisket, Franklin uses post oak wood and Meyer Angus beef which is seasoned with salt and pepper.

Awards and honors 
In Bon Appetit's July 2011 issue, editor Andrew Knowlton called Franklin Barbecue "the best BBQ in the country." In May 2015, Franklin Barbecue owner Aaron Franklin was awarded a James Beard Foundation Award for Best Chef: Southwest. He is the first chef who specializes in barbecue to be nominated, or receive, the award. In 2013, Franklin Barbecue was ranked first in Texas Monthly's "The 50 Best BBQ Joints" and was featured on the list again in 2017.

Notable patrons 
Franklin Barbecue has attracted a number of famous visitors that includes President Barack Obama, David Chang, Anthony Bourdain, Gordon Ramsay, Jon Favreau, and Jimmy Kimmel.

BBQ with Franklin

In 2013, Austin PBS station KLRU worked with Aaron Franklin to produce a web series, BBQ with Franklin, on barbecue. This show appears on the Create TV network which is part of the PBS family.

Web Episodes

TV Episodes

See also
 List of barbecue restaurants

References

External links

Culture of Austin, Texas
Barbecue restaurants in the United States
2009 establishments in Texas